Ek Nanhi Munni Ladki Thi is a 1970 Bollywood drama film directed by Vishram Bedekar. The film stars Prithviraj Kapoor, Mumtaz and Helen. This movie is supposed to be the first or one of the first attempts of the Ramsay Brothers in the horror genre, notwithstanding the fact that consequently, the name Ramsay Brothers had become synonymous with horror movies in Indian cinema
.

Cast
Mumtaz
Bobby  
Laxmi Chhaya   
Nadira
Helen  
Jayant   
Prithviraj Kapoor   
Surendra Kumar   
Mubarak   
Sajjan   
Shatrughan Sinha

Soundtrack
Asad Bhopali wrote the songs.

References

External links
 

1970 films
1970s Hindi-language films
1970 drama films
Indian slasher films